Kazakhmys Hockey Club (Qazaqmys hokkeı klýby), commonly referred as Kazakhmys Satbayev, is a professional ice hockey team based in Satbayev, Kazakhstan. They were founded in 2002, and play in the Kazakhstan Hockey Championship, the top level of ice hockey in Kazakhstan.

Achievements
Kazakhstan Hockey Championship:
Winners (1): 2005–06
Runners-up (3): 2002–03, 2004–05, 2006–07
3rd place (2): 2003–04, 2008–09
Kazakhstan Hockey Cup:
Winners (1): 2005, 2006, 2008
Vysshaya Liga:
3rd place (1): 2007–08

Head coaches
Petr Pavluchenko 2002–03
Anatoli Kartayev 2003–07
Sergei Ichenski 2007–08
Sergei Mogilnikov 2008–09
Sergei Mahinko 2009–10
Dmitri Glavyuk 2010–11

External links
Kazakhmys Satpaev at Eliteprospects.com

Defunct ice hockey teams in Kazakhstan
Kazakhmys